

Events

January–March 
 January 6 – Florida Governor Thomas Brown signs legislation that provides public support for the new East Florida Seminary, leading to the establishment of the University of Florida.
 January 8 – Taiping Rebellion: Zeng Guofan is ordered to assist the governor of Hunan in organising a militia force to search for local bandits.
 January 12 – Taiping Rebellion: The Taiping army occupies Wuchang.
 January 19 – Giuseppe Verdi's opera Il Trovatore premieres in performance at Teatro Apollo in Rome.
 February 10 – Taiping Rebellion: Taiping forces assemble at Hanyang, Hankou, and Wuchang, for the march on Nanjing.
 February 12 – The city of Puerto Montt is founded in the Reloncaví Sound, Chile.
 February 22 – Washington University in St. Louis is founded as Eliot Seminary.
 March – The clothing company Levi Strauss & Co. is founded in the United States.
 March 4 – Inauguration of Franklin Pierce as 14th President of the United States (his only child was killed in a train accident on January 6).
 March 5 – Saint Paul Fire and Marine, as predecessor of The Travelers Companies, a worldwide insurance service, founded in Minnesota, United States.
 March 20 – Taiping Rebellion: A rebel army of around 750,000 seizes Nanjing, killing 30,000 Imperial troops.
 March 29 – Manchester is granted city status in the United Kingdom.

April–June 
 April 7 – Prince Leopold, the youngest son and the eighth child of Queen Victoria and Prince Albert, is born.
 April 16 – Indian Railways: The first passenger railway in India opens from Bombay to Thana, Maharashtra, .
 May
 The world's first public aquarium opens, at the London Zoo.
 An outbreak of yellow fever kills 7,790 in New Orleans.
 Isambard Kingdom Brunel accepts John Scott Russell's tender for construction of the  passenger steamer.
 May 5 – Perpetual Maritime Truce comes into force between the United Kingdom and the rulers of the Sheikhdoms of the Lower Gulf, later known as the Trucial States.
 May 12–October 31 – The Great Industrial Exhibition is held in Dublin, Ireland.
 May 23 – The first plat for Seattle, Washington, is laid out.
 June 27 – Taiping Rebellion: The Northern Expeditionary Force crosses the Yellow River.
 June 30 – Georges-Eugène Haussmann is selected as préfect of the Seine (department) to begin the re-planning of Paris.

July–September 
 July 1 - The Swiss watch company Tissot is founded.
 July 8 – U.S. Commodore Matthew C. Perry arrives in Edo Bay, Japan, with a request for a trade treaty.
 July 25 – Outlaw and bandit Joaquin Murrieta is killed in California.
 July 27 – Iesada succeeds his father Ieyoshi as Japanese shōgun. The Late Tokugawa shogunate (the last part of the Edo period in Japan) begins.
 August 12 – New Zealand acquires self-government.
 August 23 – The first true International Meteorological Organization is established in Brussels, Belgium.
 August 24
 The Royal Norwegian Navy Museum is founded at Karljohansvern in Horten, perhaps the world's first naval museum.
 Potato chips are first prepared, by George Crum at Saratoga Springs, New York, according to popular accounts.
 September 19 – Hudson Taylor first leaves for China.
 September 20 – Otis Elevator, as predecessor of Otis Worldwide, was founded in the United States.

October–December 

 October 1 – C. Bechstein's piano factory is founded, one of three established in a "golden year" in the history of the piano (Julius Blüthner and Steinway & Sons being the others).
 October 4–5 – Crimean War: The Ottoman Empire begins war with Russia.
 October 4 – On the east coast of the United States, Donald McKay launches the Great Republic, the world's biggest sailing ship, which at 4,500 tons is too large to be successful.
 October 28 – Crimean War: The Ottoman army crosses the Danube into Vidin/Calafat, Wallachia.
 October 30 – Taiping Rebellion: The Taiping Northern Expeditionary Force comes within  of Tianjin.
 November 3 – Troops of William Walker capture La Paz in Baja California Territory and declare the (short-lived) Republic of Lower California.
 November 4 – Crimean War: Battle of Oltenitza – Turkish forces defeat the Russians.
 November 15 – Maria II of Portugal is succeeded by her son Pedro V.
 November 30 (November 18 O.S.) – Crimean War: Battle of Sinop – The Russian fleet destroys the Turkish fleet.
 December 6 – Taiping Rebellion: French minister de Bourboulon arrives at the Heavenly Capital, aboard the Cassini.
 December 14 – Compagnie Générale des Eaux, predecessor of Vivendi and Veolia, a global media conglomerate, is founded in Paris, France.

Date unknown 
 The Independent Santa Cruz Maya of Eastern Yucatán is recognized as an independent nation by the British Empire.
 Arthur de Gobineau begins publication of his An Essay on the Inequality of the Human Races (Essai sur l'inégalité des races humaines).
 Charles Pravaz and Alexander Wood independently invent a practical hypodermic syringe.
 Wheaton Academy is founded in West Chicago, Illinois.
 The Chartered Bank of India, Australia and China is incorporated in London by Scotsman James Wilson, under a Royal Charter from Queen Victoria.
 Ishikawajima Shipyard, as predecessor of IHI Corporation, a shipyard and transport-related machinery manufacturer in Japan, is founded.
 Melbourne Cricket Ground, now the largest sports stadium in the Southern Hemisphere, officially opens.
 1853–1873 – More than 130,000 Chinese laborers come to Cuba.

Births

January–June 

 January 1 – Karl von Einem, German general (d. 1934)
 January 16
Johnston Forbes-Robertson, English actor (d. 1937)
Sir Ian Hamilton, British general (d. 1947)
 January 28 
 José Martí, Cuban revolutionary (d. 1895)
 Vladimir Solovyov, Russian philosopher (d. 1900)
 January 29 – Kitasato Shibasaburō, Japanese physician, bacteriologist (d. 1931)
 February 4 – Kaneko Kentarō, Japanese politician, diplomat (d. 1942)
 February 18 – Ernest Fenollosa, Catalan-American philosopher (d. 1908)
 February 22 – Annie Le Porte Diggs, Canadian-born state librarian of Kansas (d. 1916)
 March 2 – Ella Loraine Dorsey, American author, journalist, and translator (d. 1935)
 March 5 – Howard Pyle, American artist, fiction writer (d. 1911)
 March 10 – Thomas Mackenzie, 18th Prime Minister of New Zealand (d. 1930)
 March 13 – Robert William Felkin, British writer (d. 1926)
 March 14 – Ferdinand Hodler, Swiss painter (d. 1918)
 March 25 – Mozaffar ad-Din Shah Qajar, 5th Qajarid Shah of Persia (d. 1907)
 March 27 – Yakov Zhilinsky, Russian general (d. 1918)
 March 29 – Elihu Thomson, English-American engineer, inventor, co-founder of General Electric (d. 1937)
 March 30 – Vincent van Gogh, Dutch painter (d. 1890)
 April 6 – Emil Jellinek, German automobile entrepreneur (d. 1918) 
 April 7
 Ella Eaton Kellogg, American pioneer in dietetics (d. 1920)
 Prince Leopold, Duke of Albany (d. 1884)
 April 22 – Alphonse Bertillon, French police officer, forensic scientist (d. 1914)
 April 30 – Alexey Abaza, Russian admiral and politician (d. 1917) 
 May 4 – Marie Robinson Wright, American travel writer (d. 1914)
 May 20
Ella Hoag Brockway Avann, American educator (d. 1899)
Vladimir Viktorovich Sakharov, Russian general (d. 1920)
 May 28 – Carl Larsson, Swedish painter (d. 1919)
 June 3 – William Flinders Petrie, English Egyptologist (d. 1942)
 June 12 – Chester Adgate Congdon, American mining magnate (d. 1916)

July–December 

 July 4 – Ernst Otto Beckmann, German chemist (d. 1923)
 July 5 – Cecil Rhodes, English businessman (d. 1902)
 July 10 – Percy Scott, British admiral (d. 1924)
 July 18 – Hendrik Lorentz, Dutch physicist, Nobel Prize laureate (d. 1928)
 July 24 – William Gillette, American actor, playwright and stage-manager (d. 1937)
 July 26 – Philip Cowen, American Jewish publisher and author (d. 1943)
 July 29 – Ioan Culcer, Romanian general and politician (d. 1928)
 August 23 – João Marques de Oliveira, Portuguese painter (d. 1927)
 August 28
 Vladimir Shukhov, Russian engineer, polymath, scientist and architect (d. 1939)
 Franz I, Prince of Liechtenstein (d. 1938)
 September 1 – Aleksei Brusilov, Russian general (d. 1926)
 September 2 – Wilhelm Ostwald, German chemist, Nobel Prize laureate (d. 1932)
 September 6 – Katherine Eleanor Conway, American journalist, editor, poet, and Laetare Medalist (d. 1927)
 September 16 – Albrecht Kossel, German physician, recipient of the Nobel Prize in Physiology or Medicine (d. 1927)
 September 20 – Chulalongkorn, Rama V, King of Siam (d. 1910)
 September 21 – Heike Kamerlingh Onnes, Dutch physicist, Nobel Prize laureate (d. 1926)
 September 23 – Fritz von Below, German general (d. 1918)
 October 4 – Jane Maria Read, American poet and teacher (unknown year of death)
 October 13 – Lillie Langtry, English stage actress (d. 1929)
 October 14 – John William Kendrick, American railroad executive (d. 1924)
 October 17 – Grand Duchess Maria Alexandrovna of Russia, wife of Prince Alfred, Duke of Edinburgh (d. 1920)
 October 26 – Tokugawa Akitake, Japanese daimyō, the last lord of Mito Domain, younger brother of the last shōgun Tokugawa Yoshinobu (d. 1910)
 October 30 – Louise Abbéma, French painter, sculptor, and designer of the Belle Époque (d. 1927)
 November 9 – Stanford White, American architect (d. 1906)
 November 13 – John Drew, Jr., American stage actor (d. 1927)
 November 20 – Oskar Potiorek, Austro-Hungarian general (d. 1933)
 November 29 – Panagiotis Danglis, Greek general, politician (d. 1924)
 December 6 – Hara Prasad Shastri, Indian academic, Sanskrit scholar, archivist and historian of Bengali literature (d. 1931)
 December 14 – Errico Malatesta, Italian anarchist (d. 1932)
 December 17 – Émile Roux, French physician, bacteriologist and immunologist (d. 1933)
 December 21 – Noda Utarō, Japanese entrepreneur and politician (d. 1927)
 December 22 
 Sarada Devi, Indian mystic and saint (d. 1920)
 Teresa Carreño, Venezuelan pianist, singer, composer, and conductor (d. 1917)
 December 23 – William Henry Moody, 35th United States Secretary of the Navy, 45th United States Attorney General, and Associate Justice of the Supreme Court of the United States (d. 1917)
 December 31 – Tasker H. Bliss, American general (d. 1930)

Date unknown
 William O'Malley, Irish politician (d. 1939)

Deaths

January–June 

 January 8 – Mihály Bertalanits, Slovene (Prekmurje Slovene) poet in the Kingdom of Hungary (b. 1788)
 January 16
 Matteo Carcassi, Italian composer (b. 1792)
 Archduke Rainer Joseph of Austria, Archduke of Austria, Prince Royal of Hungary and Bohemia (b. 1783)
 Robert Lucas, governor of Ohio, United States (b. 1781)
 January 19 – Karl Faber, German historian (b. 1773)
 January 22 – Méry von Bruiningk, Estonian democrat (b. 1818)
 February 4 – Princess Maria Amélia of Brazil, daughter of Emperor Pedro I of Brazil (b. 1831)
 February 6 – Anastasio Bustamante, 4th President of Mexico (b. 1780)
 February 15 – August, Prince of Hohenlohe-Öhringen (b. 1784)
 March 17 – Christian Doppler, Austrian mathematician (b. 1803)
 March 30 – Abigail Fillmore, First Lady of the United States (b. 1798)
 April 18 – William R. King, 13th Vice President of the United States (b. 1786)
 April 28 – Ludwig Tieck, German writer (b. 1773)
 May 18 – Lionel Kieseritzky, Baltic-German chess player (b. 1806)
 June 2
 Lucas Alamán, Mexican statesman, historian (b. 1792)
 Henry Trevor, 21st Baron Dacre, British peer, soldier (b. 1777)
 June 7 – Giuseppina Ronzi de Begnis, Italian opera singer (b. 1800)
 June 8 – Howard Vyse, English soldier and Egyptologist (b. 1784)
 June 27 – Lewis Brian Adams, English painter (b. 1809)

July–December 

 July 27 – Tokugawa Ieyoshi, 12th shōgun of the Tokugawa shogunate of Japan (b. 1793)
 August 9 – Józef Maria Hoene-Wroński, Polish philosopher (b. 1776)
 August 19 – George Cockburn, British naval commander (b. 1772)
 August 21 - Maria Quitéria, Brazilian national heroine (b. 1792)
 August 23 – Alexander Calder, first mayor of Beaumont, Texas (b. 1806)
 August 29 – Charles James Napier, British army general and colonial administrator (b. 1782)
 September 3 – Augustin Saint-Hilaire, French botanist, traveller (b. 1799)
 September 6 – George Bradshaw, English timetable publisher (b. 1800)
 October 2 – François Arago, French Catalan mathematician, physicist, astronomer and politician (b. 1786)
 October 3 – George Onslow, French composer (b. 1784)
 October 5 – Mahlon Dickerson, American judge, politician (b. 1770)
 October 13 – Jan Cock Blomhoff, Dutch director of Dejima, Japan (b. 1779)
 October 22 – Juan Antonio Lavalleja, Uruguayan military, political figure (b. 1784)
 October 27 – Maria White Lowell, American abolitionist (b. 1821)
 November 15 – Queen Maria II of Portugal (b. 1819)
 December 15 – Georg Friedrich Grotefend, German epigraphist, philologist (b. 1775)
 December 23 – Juliette Bussière Laforest-Courtois, Haitian journalist (b. 1789)

Date unknown 
 Meta Forkel-Liebeskind, German writer and scholar (b. 1765)
 Qiu Ersao, Chinese rebel and military commander (b. 1822)
 Ferdinando Quaglia, Italian painter of portrait miniatures (b. 1780)

References